64: Part I is a 2016 Japanese suspense mystery drama film directed by Takahisa Zeze. It was released in Japan by Toho on May 7, 2016. The second part, 64: Part II, was released on June 11, 2016.

1989 is the 64 Shouwa year in the Japanese calendar, thus the unsolved girl kidnapping-murder case is called "64(rokuyon)" that got up in this year in Criminal Investigation Department in the Prefectural Police Department. And 14 years were over as the prefecture's police to be unsolved greatest stain, and statute of limitations approached it. In 2002, Yoshinobu Mikami, an ex-detective who was assigned as the investigator of the "Rokuyon" case 14years ago, moves as a Public Relations Officer in the Police Affairs Department against his will. As a newly assigned Public Relations Officer, he was troubled with the relation between the reporters, new case has occurred. And that new case traced "Rokuyon" case exactly.

Plot
1989 is the 64 Shouwa year in the Japanese calendar, thus the unsolved girl kidnapping-murder case is called "64(rokuyon)" that got up in this year in Criminal Investigation Department in the Prefectural Police Department. And 14 years were over as the prefecture's police to be unsolved greatest stain, and statute of limitations approached it. In 2002, Yoshinobu Mikami, an ex-detective who was assigned as the investigator of the "Rokuyon" case 14years ago, moves as a Public Relations Officer in the Police Affairs Department against his will. As a newly assigned Public Relations Officer, he was troubled with the relation between the reporters, new case has occurred. And that new case traced "Rokuyon" case exactly.

Reception
The film was third placed at the Japanese box office on its opening, with 203,703 admissions and grossing . On its second weekend, it was fifth placed. As of June 26, 2016, the film has grossed  in Japan.

References

External links
 

Japanese mystery drama films
2010s mystery drama films
Toho films
Films directed by Takahisa Zeze
2016 drama films
2010s Japanese films